Microcolona aurantiella is a moth in the family Elachistidae. It is found in south-eastern Siberia and Korea.

References

Moths described in 1988
Microcolona
Moths of Asia